Rabia Nasimi (born 15 December 1993) is a former refugee who fled Afghanistan with her parents and siblings in 1999 and now campaigns for refugee rights in London.

Early life and education
Nasimi and her family fled Afghanistan in 1999 out of fear of persecution at the hands of the Taliban. They arrived in the UK in the back of a refrigerated container  and in 2001 the family established the Afghanistan and Central Asian Association (ACAA), a charity dedicated to improving the lives of Afghans and all refugees in London. 

In 2012, she studied BA Sociology and Politics at Goldsmiths University of London. She then completed an MSc in Sociology (Research) at the London School of Economics and Political Science. In 2017 she was accepted as a sociology PhD candidate at the University of Cambridge.

Career
Nasimi is a refugee activist in London and has worked for the Afghanistan and Central Asian Association (ACAA) as the organisation's development officer, where she was responsible for launching several services and shaping the charities long term strategy. In 2020, Rabia joined the Civil Service as a Fast Stream Social Researcher at the Department for Health and Social Care. She is now working as a Policy Lead at the Department for Levelling Up, Housing and Communities in the Afghan Resettlement Team.

Honours and awards
In 2015 she was nominated for the Afghan Professionals Network Aspire Award for outstanding contributions to the Afghan community in London while in 2017 she was nominated for the Lewisham Mayors Award for contributions to Lewisham. In 2018 she was nominated for the WeAreTheCity Rising Stars Award, shortlisted for the Women of the Future Award, and for the Asian Voice Charity Awards in the most inspiring young person category for her work advocating refugee rights both in the UK and Afghanistan.

References 

1993 births
Living people
Afghan refugees
Afghan human rights activists
Afghan expatriates in England